Asterivora tillyardi is a species of moth in the family Choreutidae. It is endemic to New Zealand and collected at  Aoraki / Mount Cook. Adults of this species are on the wing in March.

Taxonomy 
This species was first described by Alfred Philpott in 1924, collected by Dr. R. J. Tillyard on Aoraki / Mount Cook at 2,500 ft in March, and named Simaethis tillyardi. George Hudson discussed and illustrated this species in his 1928 publication The butterflies and moths of New Zealand. In 1979 J. S. Dugdale placed this species within the genus Asterivora. In 1988 Dugdale confirmed this placement. The male holotype specimen, collected at Mount Cook, is held at the New Zealand Arthropod Collection.

Description 
Philpott described this species as follows:

Distribution 
This species is endemic to New Zealand.

Behaviour 
Adults of this species are on the wing in March.

References

Asterivora
Moths of New Zealand
Endemic fauna of New Zealand
Moths described in 1924
Taxa named by Alfred Philpott
Endemic moths of New Zealand